Osvaldo may refer to the following people:

Given name
Osvaldo Alonso, Cuban football player
Osvaldo Ardiles (born 1952), an Argentine football player and coach
Osvaldo Bagnoli, an Italian football coach
Osvaldo Brandão, a Brazilian football coach
Osvaldo Canobbio, a Uruguayan football player
Osvaldo Cavandoli, an Italian cartoonist
Osvaldo Cochrane Filho, a Brazilian water polo player
Osvaldo Coluccino (born 1963), Italian composer
Osvaldo Díaz, a Paraguayan football player
Osvaldo Dorticós Torrado, a Cuban politician who served as President of Cuba from 1959–1976
Osvaldo Fernández, a Cuban professional baseball player 
Osvaldo Golijov, a Grammy award winning composer of classical music
Osvaldo Hurtado, President of Ecuador from 1981–1984
Osvaldo Jeanty, a Haitian-Canadian basketball player 
Osvaldo Lara, a Cuban track and field sprinter
Osvaldo Martinez (disambiguation), several people
Osvaldo Miranda (disambiguation), several people
Osvaldo Nieves, a Puerto Rican track and field athlete
Osvaldo Núñez, a member of the Canadian House of Commons from 1993–1997
Osvaldo Peralta, a Paraguayan football defender
Osvaldo Pugliese, an Argentine tango musician
Osvaldo Ríos, Puerto Rican actor, model, singer, and guitarist
Osvaldo Soriano, an Argentine journalist and writer
Osvaldo Sosa, an Argentine footballer and manager
Osvaldo Suárez, an Argentine long-distance runner
Osvaldo Terranova, an Argentine film actor
Osvaldo Valenti, an Italian film actor
Osvaldo Zubeldía, an Argentine football player and coach
Cristian Osvaldo Álvarez, an Argentine football player
Osvaldo Lourenço Filho, a Brazilian football player

Surname
Dani Osvaldo, Italian footballer

Other
Osvaldo Vieira International Airport

Italian masculine given names
Spanish masculine given names
Portuguese masculine given names